The 2019–20 PGA Tour was the 105th season (53rd since separating from the PGA of America) of the United States-based elite men's professional golf circuit. The season started on September 12, 2019. The 2020 FedEx Cup Playoffs began on August 20, and concluded on September 7, 2020, with Dustin Johnson winning the FedEx Cup.  

The season was effectively suspended on March 12 with the cancellation of the Players Championship after the first round due to growing concerns surrounding the COVID-19 pandemic. Several more tournaments were later canceled or postponed, including all four major championships, the two remaining World Golf Championships and the Tokyo Summer Olympics. The tour resumed on June 11 with the Charles Schwab Challenge, with measures in place to mitigate the risk of virus transmission. The following week at the RBC Heritage, Nick Watney became to first player to test positive for coronavirus.

Changes for 2019–20

Rule changes
The number of players making a 36-hole cut was reduced from top 70 and ties to top 65 and ties. The 54-hole secondary cut, previously in effect when more than 78 players made a 36-hole cut, was eliminated.

Tournament changes
Date changes: in order to accommodate the 2020 Summer Olympics, the WGC-FedEx St. Jude Invitational and the alternate Barracuda Championship were both scheduled for early July, two weeks earlier than the previous season, with the 3M Open moving the other way, to late July. Several other tournaments also had new dates: the Rocket Mortgage Classic (from late June to late May); the Sanderson Farms Championship (from late October to mid September); the Shriners Hospitals for Children Open (from early November to early October).
Returning tournaments: the Greenbrier Classic and the Houston Open returned having been missing in 2018–19 due to scheduling changes; the Greenbrier, having moved from July to September, became the new season opening event, and the Houston Open was in mid-October having been held in April, the week prior to the Masters Tournament, since 2007.
New tournaments: Zozo Championship (Japan), Bermuda Championship (created as a new alternate event to the WGC-HSBC Champions). The Workday Charity Open was also created as a new, one-off event in response to scheduling changes caused by the COVID-19 pandemic.
Status changes: the Sanderson Farms Championship was upgraded from an alternate event to a full FedEx Cup point event; the Genesis Open gained invitational status and was renamed the Genesis Invitational with Tiger Woods as the tournament host.
No longer on the schedule: CIMB Classic (Malaysia).

Coronavirus pandemic

The tournament schedule has been significantly impacted by the COVID-19 pandemic. The PGA Tour played the first round of the 2020 Players Championship on March 12, and stated that subsequent rounds and tournaments would continue behind closed doors. However, the PGA Tour later announced that, "based on the rapidly changing situation", the rest of the tournament had been cancelled, as well as the next three events on the schedule (the Valspar Championship, WGC Match Play, and Valero Texas Open). On March 13, Augusta National Golf Club announced that it would postpone the Masters Tournament—the first men's major of the golf season; the tournament was to begin April 9. On March 17, the tour announced the cancellation of all scheduled tournaments through May 10 (the RBC Heritage, Zurich Classic of New Orleans, Wells Fargo Championship and AT&T Byron Nelson) and confirmed the postponement of the PGA Championship, scheduled to begin May 14, by the PGA of America.

On April 16, the tour announced several changes to the remaining schedule, with the intention of restarting with the Charles Schwab Challenge, which was moved from May 18–24 to June 11–14. Several tournaments were also rescheduled, including the RBC Heritage (which had earlier been canceled) the Memorial Tournament and the WGC-FedEx St. Jude Invitational, and others were canceled, including the RBC Canadian Open.  Furthermore, the tour also announced that three invitationals (Colonial, Heritage, Memorial) would be expanded from the usual 120-player field to become full-field (144 golfer) events.

During the hiatus, two charity exhibition matches were held. The first was a skins game, titled TaylorMade Driving Relief, held at Seminole Golf Club in Juno Beach, Florida on May 17, featuring Rory McIlroy, Dustin Johnson, Rickie Fowler and Matthew Wolff. The second was a better ball pro-celebrity match play, titled The Match: Champions for Charity, featuring Tiger Woods and Peyton Manning against Phil Mickelson and Tom Brady.

The tour resumed without spectators in mid-June with the Charles Schwab Challenge. The Memorial Tournament in mid-July was planned to be the first event to welcome back fans, but those plans were canceled the week before the tournament. On July 13, the tour announced that the remainder of the season would be played behind closed doors.

Schedule
The following table lists official events during the 2019–20 season.

Unofficial events
The following events were sanctioned by the PGA Tour, but did not carry FedEx Cup points or official money, nor were wins official.

Location of tournaments

The tournament locations below represent the original schedule, before any changes due to the COVID-19 pandemic.

FedEx Cup

Points distribution

The distribution of points for 2019–20 PGA Tour events was as follows:

Tour Championship starting score (to par), based on position in the FedEx Cup rankings after the BMW Championship:

FedEx Cup standings
For full rankings, see 2020 FedEx Cup Playoffs.

Final FedEx Cup standings of the 30 qualifiers for the Tour Championship:

• Did not play

Awards

See also
2019 in golf
2020 in golf
2020–21 Korn Ferry Tour
2020–21 PGA Tour Champions season
2019 European Tour
2020 European Tour
2019–20 PGA Tour priority ranking

Notes

References

External links
Official site
Player Handbook
Official Media Guide

2020
2019 in golf
2020 in golf
PGA Tour